St. Andrew's Presbyterian Church is a church in Lunenburg, Nova Scotia.  The congregation is the longest history of any Presbyterian congregation in Canada. After meeting at a private house, the congregation worshipped in St. John's Anglican Church (Lunenburg) (1759-1770).  The first church was built in 1770 and the first minister was  Reverend Bruin Romkes Comingo, who served the community for 50 years until he died at age 95 (1820).   The current church was built in the neo-gothic style and dates from 1828.

See also 
 Presbyterian Church in Canada
Little Dutch (Deutsch) Church
St. John's Anglican Church (Lunenburg)
 Zion Evangelical Lutheran Church (Lunenburg)

Links 
A sermon preached at Halifax, July 3d, 1770, at the ordination of the Rev. Bruin Romcas Camingoe to the Dutch Calvinistic Presbyterian Congregation at Lunenburg: by John Seccombe, of Chester, A. M., being the first preached in the province of Nova-Scotia, on such an occasion ; to which is added an appendix

References 

 History of Nova Scotia
19th-century Presbyterian church buildings in Canada
Presbyterian churches in Canada